ZADZADZ was an online video database of current television commercials, featuring everything from video games to hair care products grouped into consumer-desired categories. After the site's successful testing phase in late 2007, ZADZADZ officially launched on January 17, 2008.

Overview 

The ZADZADZ website comprises the largest collection of active television commercials online. The ads are grouped into various categories and are automatically streamed through the site's central player, depending on what playlist is selected by the user. Additional functionality also exists, including the ability to sort the ads, e-mail or embed ads, and search for ads.

ZADZADZ is a "Window Shopping 2.0" experience for the user because of its grouping of television commercials into relevant product and psychographic "channels". Browsing between individual channels allows the user to quickly shop and compare products and services via the ads themselves.

Essentially a free site, all of the basic video database content is available without registration and without providing any personal information. Any person with an e-mail address and a web browser that accepts cookies can set up an account with ZADZADZ that allows them to vote on various channels' ads and engage in many other site activities.

In addition to a consumer shopping tool, ZADZADZ is an advertising and entertainment industry resource, tracking and showcasing current brand/market trends, including celebrity endorsements, high-profile product introductions, and creative execution feedback and refinement.

History

Reason for Being 

Founded by advertising executives Russell Griffin and Chandos Erwin, ZADZADZ was created, in many ways, as a response to the DVRs and TiVos of the world. As people began to skip ads while watching their favorite TV shows, technology was empowering the consumer to watch their content without interruption. But, (perhaps unbeknownst to viewer) at the same time, technology was depriving consumers of a vital source of product information and cultural relevance. With the introduction of ZADZADZ the equation was once again balanced: With DVRs consumers could skip ads in order to get to their desired content (their TV shows), and with ZADZADZ consumers could choose which ads to watch when the ads themselves are the desired content (when preparing to make a purchase or when simply staying up with cultural trends).

Super Bowl 

On February 3, 2008 ZADZADZ launched a feature that enabled users to watch and rate the Super Bowl XLII ads as well as a media tool for outlets to report the ongoing results at any moment in time. ZADZADZ was quickly utilized as a resource by other web sites and users rated the ads in varying categories.

References

External links 
 ZADZADZ — official website
 ZADZADZ Blog — official blog

Online databases
Television commercials